is a private university in Kakamigahara, Gifu Prefecture, Japan. In 2007, the school adopted the present name.

External links
 Official website 

Educational institutions established in 1961
Private universities and colleges in Japan
Universities and colleges in Gifu Prefecture
1961 establishments in Japan
Kakamigahara, Gifu